Eugène Albertini (2 October 1880 – 15 February 1941) was a 20th-century French teacher in Latin literature, a historian of ancient Rome, especially for North Africa and an . He was a member of the Académie des inscriptions et belles-lettres (1938).

Biography 
Eugène Albertini is a student at the Lycée Henri-IV, where he won the Latin essay prize at the concours général, a former student of École Normale Supérieure (1900–1903), and a former member of the École française de Rome (1903–1906).

He started working as a teacher at the Lycée de Nantes (1906–1907) and the Lycée de Vesoul (1907–1909), then turned to research by integrating the Institute of Hispanic Studies (1909–1912). He was mobilized from 1914 to 1919, then after going to the chair of Latin literature of the University of Freiburg in Switzerland, he succeeded in 1920 to Jérôme Carcopino at the Faculty of Letters of Algiers as holder of the Chair of Antiquities of Africa that Stéphane Gsell had illustrated. From 1923 to 1932, he was Director of Antiquities of Algeria, during which period he contributed to the drafting of the Corpus des Inscriptions latines d'Algérie.
 
From 1932 to 1935, he held the chair of Roman civilization at the Collège de France then was responsible in 1936 and 1937 of the course of Roman history at the new Federal University of Rio de Janeiro.

Main publications 
1923: La Composition dans les ouvrages philosophiques de Sénèque (thesis, Sorbonne)
1923: Les Divisions administratives de l'Espagne romaine (secondary thesis, Sorbonne)
1929: L'Empire romain (reprinted in 1938 and 1940)
1930: Les ruines romaines d'Algérie, in L'Illustration, 24 May
1931: L'Algérie antique (in Histoire et historiens de l'Algérie)
1937: L'Afrique romaine 
1937: L'Afrique du Nord française dans l'histoire. With Georges Marçais and Georges Yver.

References

Bibliography 
 .

External links 
 Eugène Albertini (1880-1941) on data.bnf.fr

Lycée Henri-IV alumni
French scholars of Roman history
École Normale Supérieure alumni
Academic staff of the Collège de France
Members of the Académie des Inscriptions et Belles-Lettres
French epigraphers
1880 births
People from Compiègne
1941 deaths